Sample or samples may refer to:

Base meaning
 Sample (statistics), a subset of a population – complete data set
 Sample (signal), a digital discrete sample of a continuous analog signal
 Sample (material), a specimen or small quantity of something 
 Sample (graphics), an intersection of a color channel and a pixel
 SAMPLE history, a mnemonic acronym for questions medical first responders should ask
 Product sample, a sample of a consumer product that is given to the consumer so that he or she may try a product before committing to a purchase
 Standard cross-cultural sample, a sample of 186 cultures, used by scholars engaged in cross-cultural studies

People
Sample (surname)
Samples (surname)
 Junior Samples (1926–1983), American comedian

Places
 Sample, Kentucky, unincorporated community, United States
 Sampleville, Ohio, unincorporated community, United States
 Hugh W. and Sarah Sample House, listed on the National Register of Historic Places in Iowa, United States

Other uses
 USS Sample (FF-1048), a frigate in the U.S. Navy
 The Sample, a defunct department store in Buffalo, New York, U.S.

See also 
 Sampler (disambiguation)
 Sampling (disambiguation)


